The following lists events that happened during 1940 in Chile.

Incumbents
President of Chile: Pedro Aguirre Cerda

Events

August
20 August – The Deportes Luis Matte Larraín football club is founded.

Births 
date unknown – Catalina Parra
14 April – Hugo Lepe (d. 1991)
11 May – Juan Downey (d. 1993)
12 August – Fernando Alarcón
7 November – Antonio Skármeta
22 November – Alberto Fouilloux (d. 2018)
28 December – Don Francisco

Deaths
29 February – Fernando Irarrázaval Mackenna

References 

 
Years of the 20th century in Chile
Chile